Amos Mansdorf (born 20 October 1965) is an Israeli former professional tennis player.

His career-high singles ranking was World No. 18 (achieved in November 1987), the highest ever for any male Israeli tennis player. His career-high doubles ranking was World No. 67 (May 1986).

Early and personal life

Mansdorf grew up in Ramat HaSharon, a small city north of Tel Aviv, and is Jewish. All four of his grandparents had emigrated from Poland to Israel in the 1930s. His father Jacob is a chemical engineer, and his mother Era is a teacher. He started playing tennis when he was 10 years old. He trained at the Israel Tennis Centers. He lives in Herzlia, Israel.

Tennis career

1980s
In 1983 Mansdorf won the Asian Junior Championship in Hong Kong. That same year he turned professional, and started his mandatory Israeli army service. During his service he played at the demonstration event of the 1984 Summer Olympics in Los Angeles, and lost in the first round. He reached the quarterfinals at both the 1984 US Open and Canadian Open Juniors.

Immediately after completing his service, in November 1986 he beat World # 5 Henri Leconte 6–2, 6–7, 6–3, in Wembley, United Kingdom. He won his first tour singles title later that month at Johannesburg, beating World # 10 Andrés Gómez 6–4, 6–4 in the quarterfinals, and defeating American Matt Anger in the final.

His career-high singles ranking was World No. 18 (achieved in November 1987), the highest ever for any male Israeli tennis player. His second singles title came in 1987 in his hometown of Ramat Hasharon. In the semifinals he beat World # 6 Jimmy Connors, 7–6, 6–3, and in the finals he beat World # 12 Brad Gilbert, 3–6, 6–3, 6–4.

The third title was in January 1988 at Auckland. In March he beat World # 4 Boris Becker, 6–4, 6–4, in Orlando. In October that year he won the biggest title of his career at the Paris Open (now part of the Tennis Masters Series). He faced the World # 1 Mats Wilander, but the Swede retired before the tournament began. Mansdorf beat Aaron Krickstein and Jakob Hlasek, two top 10 players, on his way to the final. He beat Gilbert in the final in straight sets, 6–3, 6–2, 6–3.

He also played at the 1988 Olympics in Seoul,  where tennis was an official sport, and this time reached the 3rd round (the final 16 players) defeating Yoo Jin-sun and Kelly Evernden before losing to Tim Mayotte. In March 1989 in Scottsdale he upset World # 13 Thomas Muster, 7–5, 6–2, and World # 15 Gilbert 5–7, 6–3, 6–0.

1990s
Mansdorf won another title at Rosmalen in the Netherlands in 1990. In the third round of the US Open in 1990 he beat World # 8 Brad Gilbert 5–7, 5–7, 6–3, 7–6, 6–1. In September 1991 in Toulouse, he beat World # 11 Magnus Gustafsson, 6–4, 6–1.

His best performance at a Grand Slam tournament came at the Australian Open in 1992, where he reached the quarterfinals by beating Peter Lundgren, Arnaud Boetsch, Richey Reneberg and Aaron Krickstein before losing to the eventual champion, Jim Courier. In February 1992 in Philadelphia, he upset World # 3 Michael Stich 7–6 (5), 7–5. In January 1993 in Sydney, he beat World # 13 Carlos Costa 6–1, 5–7, 6–4. He qualified for the 1992 Olympics, but had to withdraw because of injury.

Mansdorf's sixth and final career title came in 1993 at Washington, DC, during which he beat World # 11 Petr Korda 6–3, 6–3. In July 1994 in Toronto, he beat World # 8 Todd Martin 6–7 (4), 6–3, retired, and in August at Cincinnati he upset Korda (World # 14) 6–3, 6–3, and Boris Becker (World # 8), 7–6 (1), 6–4.

He reached the fourth round of the US Open and Wimbledon and the finals of the US Pro Indoor Championships.

In addition to his six titles, he reached ten other finals but lost, four of them in Ramat Hasharon. During his career, he won 304 matches and lost 231, and earned prize money of US$2,412,691.

Davis Cup

In Davis Cup, Mansdorf played 10 years and won 22 matches (second-most ever by an Israeli, to Shlomo Glickstein, through 2008) against 25 losses, including a 15–4 record in singles matches on hard courts or carpet. He played a major role in Israel's success in this competition, when Israel played six years in the world group between 1987 and 1994.

Retirement

Mansdorf retired in 1994. Mansdorf next worked as a diamond merchant in Ramat Aviv. He serves as chairman of the Israel Tennis Center, and works in the Israel Tennis Association's youth program.

Between 2000 and 2004, he served as Israel's Davis Cup captain.

As of 2015, he was coaching 17-year-old Israeli Davis Cup player Edan Leshem.

ATP career finals

Singles: 16 (6 titles, 10 runner-ups)

Doubles: 1 (1 runner-up)

Performance timelines

Singles

Doubles

See also
List of select Jewish tennis players

References

External links 
 
 
 
 
 
 

1965 births
Living people
Israeli people of Polish-Jewish descent
People with chronic fatigue syndrome
Hopman Cup competitors
Jewish Israeli sportspeople
Jewish tennis players
Israeli male tennis players
Tennis players at the 1984 Summer Olympics
Tennis players at the 1988 Summer Olympics
Olympic tennis players of Israel
Sportspeople from Tel Aviv
People from Herzliya
People from Ramat HaSharon